The 2008 India Open Grand Prix Gold was a badminton tournament which took place at Kotla Vijay Bhaskar Reddy Indoor Stadium in Hyderabad, India from 1 to 6 April 2008, and had a total purse of $120,000.

Men's singles

Seeds

 Bao Chunlai (withdrew)
 Chen Jin (second round)
 Chen Yu (quarter-finals)
 Park Sung-hwan (third round)
 Boonsak Ponsana (champion)
 Wong Choong Hann (third round)
 Shōji Satō (second round)
 Lee Tsuen Seng (second round)

Finals

Women's singles

Seeds

 Xie Xingfang (withdrew)
 Lu Lan (final)
 Zhu Lin (semi-finals)
 Xu Huaiwen (withdrew)
 Wong Mew Choo (withdrew)
 Zhou Mi (champion)
 Yip Pui Yin (quarter-finals)
 Eriko Hirose (semi-finals)

Finals

Men's doubles

Seeds

 Jung Jae-sung / Lee Yong-dae (semi-finals)
 Tony Gunawan /  Candra Wijaya (semi-finals)
 Hwang Ji-man / Lee Jae-jin (first round)
 Shintaro Ikeda / Shuichi Sakamoto (withdrew)
 Guo Zhendong / Xie Zhongbo (champion)
 Keita Masuda / Tadashi Ōtsuka (quarter-finals)
 Hendra Aprida Gunawan / Joko Riyadi (withdrew)
 Albertus Susanto Njoto / Yohan Hadikusumo Wiratama (quarter-finals)

Finals

Women's doubles

Seeds

 Cheng Wen-hsing / Chien Yu-chin (champion)
 Miyuki Maeda / Satoko Suetsuna (final)
 Jiang Yanmei / Li Yujia (quarter-finals)
 Aki Akao / Tomomi Matsuda (second round)

Finals

Mixed doubles

Seeds

 He Hanbin / Yu Yang (champion)
 Sudket Prapakamol / Saralee Thungthongkam (quarter-finals)
 
 Robert Mateusiak / Nadieżda Kostiuczyk (semi-finals)

 Kristof Hopp / Birgit Overzier (finals)
 Devin Lahardi Fitriawan / Lita Nurlita (second round)
 Ingo Kindervater / Kathrin Piotrowski (first round)

Finals

References

External links
 Tournament Link
 India Open 2008 at www.badmintoncentral.com

India Open (badminton)
India Open
2008 in Indian sport
India Open
Sports competitions in Hyderabad, India